Sigrid Kehl (born 23 November 1932) is a German operatic soprano and mezzo-soprano.

Life and career 
Born in Berlin, Kehl first studied singing at the Thuringian State Conservatory in Erfurt. Later she continued her education at the Berlin University of the Arts in piano and singing.

In 1956 she made her debut at the Berlin State Opera as Eleve (student) in the small role of the Polowetz girl in Borodin's Prince Igor conducted by Horst Stein, while still a member of the opera studio. In 1956 she won the 2nd prize at the Robert Schumann International Competition for Pianists and Singers. Thereupon she was engaged by the then General Music Director  in Leipzig.

In 1957 she became a permanent member of the ensemble at the Leipzig Opera. Kehl remained a member of the ensemble for over 35 years. In the course of her career she sang over 70 roles at the Leipzig Opera House, ranging from the lyrical mezzo-soprano to the dramatic soprano. She began with classical beginner roles such as Ines in Il trovatore, the Polowetz maid or Mercedes in Carmen. Later she included the dramatic mezzo roles in her repertoire: Amneris in Aida, Princess Eboli in Don Carlos, Venus in Tannhäuser and Brangäne in Tristan und Isolde. In addition there were the classical trousers roles like Octavian in Der Rosenkavalier and Orpheus in Gluck's Orfeo ed Euridice. In 1964 she sang the role of the Nurse in Strauss' opera Die Frau ohne Schatten directed by Joachim Herz.

At the beginning of the 1970s, Kehl made the switch to the dramatic soprano repertoire. Her first soprano role at the Leipzig Opera House in 1970 was Leonore in Fidelio. In 1974 she sang Brünnhilde in the legendary Ring production by Joachim Herz at the Leipzig Opera House. Her first Isolde followed at the Leipzig Opera House in 1981; the conductor was Kurt Masur. In the 1982/83 season she assumed the role of Kundry in a new production of Wagner's Parsifal at the Leipzig Opera House.

From 1971 she had a guest contract with the Berlin State Opera. She made her debut there in 1971 as the Nurse in the Die Frau ohne Schatten production by Harry Kupfer. She also performed at the Komische Oper Berlin as Penelope in Il ritorno d'Ulisse in patria directed by Götz Friedrich. At the Vienna State Opera, she sang Ortrud in Lohengrin (1975-1976) and Venus (1979). In March 1977 she took over the title role of the opera Elektra at the Theater Hagen as a substitute at a few hours'notice; she thus saved the premiere of the new production. In the 1980/81 season (premiere: January 1981) she once again took on a premiere role at the Theater Hagen in Elektra, this time in the role of Klytämnestra (as a replacement for her ill colleague Rose Wagemann).

From 1960, Kehl also gave international guest performances; she sang at the Grand Théâtre de Genève, in Bern, at the Opernhaus Graz (1972, as Sextus in La clemenza di Tito), at the Bolshoi Theatre in Moscow (as Fricka in Das Rheingold), in Prague (as sexton), Budapest, Sofia and Varna. At the Teatro La Fenice in Venice she also sang the roles of Ortrud and Brangäne under the musical direction of Zubin Mehta.

Her last new role was Herodias in Salome. She sang it in Venice at the Teatro La Fenice (1969) and at the Semperoper in Dresden (Production by Joachim Herz). With the role of the Kostelnička in Janáček's opera Jenůfa she left the stage in 1989; she had first worked on this role in the 1968/69 season under the conductor Václav Neumann in Leipzig. Kehl still had a contract for the roles of Kundry and Küsterin for the 1989/90 season; however, she preferred to resign due to the changes during the Wende period. She was appointed an honorary member of the Leipzig Opera House.

From 1979 she taught as a singing professor at the Musikhochschule Leipzig.

Repertoire 
She sang almost all the great dramatic roles of opera literature. She took on roles in both soprano and mezzo-soprano. The highlights of her artistic activity as a singer were her embodiments of the nurse in Die Frau ohne Schatten and Brünnhilde in Der Ring des Nibelungen. Another important role of Kehl was Marie in Berg's opera Wozzeck.

The musical work of Sigrid Kehl, handed down through radio recordings, live recordings and records, has been partially re-released on CD in recent years. Her recordings include Mercedes in Carmen''' (1960; complete recording with Soňa Červená, Rolf Apreck; conductor: Herbert Kegel), Zenobia in Radamisto (complete recording), Preziosilla in La forza del destino (cross-section/extracts with Hanne-Lore Kuhse, Martin Ritzmann) and Princess Eboli in Don Carlos (cross-section/extracts with Kuhse/Ritzmann; conducted by Heinz Fricke). A solo recital entitled Ein Opernabend mit Sigrid Kehl was also published. All recordings were originally published in the GDR by the record label .

 Theatre 
 1957: A.Borodin: Prince Igor – director: Erich-Alexander Winds (Deutsche Staatsoper Berlin)

 Further reading 
 Karl-Josef Kutsch, Leo Riemens: Großes Sängerlexikon. Third, extended edition. K. G. Saur, Munich 1999. Volume 3: Hirata-Möwes, .
 Sigrid Kehl: Reduziert kann ich nicht sein. Conversation with Sigrid Kehl in Orpheus'', July 1993, .

References

External links 
 
 

1932 births
Living people
Singers from Berlin
German operatic sopranos
German operatic mezzo-sopranos
20th-century German women opera singers